154 (one hundred [and] fifty-four) is the natural number following 153 and preceding 155.

In mathematics
154 is a nonagonal number. Its factorization makes 154 a sphenic number

There is no integer with exactly 154 coprimes below it, making 154 a noncototient, nor is there, in base 10, any integer that added up to its own digits yields 154, making 154 a self number

With just 17 cuts, a pancake can be cut up into 154 pieces (Lazy caterer's sequence).

The distinct prime factors of 154 add up to 20, and so do the ones of 153, hence the two form a Ruth-Aaron pair. 154! + 1 is a factorial prime.

In music
 154 is an album by Wire, named for the number of live gigs Wire had performed at that time

In the military
  was a United States Navy Trefoil-class concrete barge during World War II
  was a United States Navy Admirable-class minesweeper during World War II
  was a United States Navy Wickes-class destroyer during World War II
  was a United States Navy General G. O. Squier-class transport during World War II
  was a United States Navy Haskell-class attack transport during World War II
  was a United States Navy Buckley-class destroyer escort ship during World War II
 Strike Fighter Squadron 154 (VFA-154) is a United States Navy strike fighter squadron stationed at Naval Air Station Lemoore
 Convoy ON-154 was a convoy of ships in December 1942 during World War II

In sports

 Major League Baseball teams played 154 games a season prior to expansion in 1961
 Golfer Jack Nicklaus played in a record 154 consecutive major championships from the 1957 U.S. Open to the 1998 U.S. Open

In transportation
 Seattle Bus Route 154
 The Maserati Tipo 154 racecar, also known as 151/4, was produced in 1965

In other fields
154 is also:
 The year AD 154 or 154 BC
 154 AH is a year in the Islamic calendar that corresponds to that corresponds to 770 – 771 AD
154 Bertha is a dark outer Main belt asteroid
 Ross 154 is a red dwarf star near the southern constellation Sagittarius
 Psalm 154
 Shakespeare’s 154 sonnets, the last being Sonnet 154
 Elcapo No. 154, Saskatchewan is a rural municipality in Saskatchewan, Canada
 The atomic number of an element temporarily called Unpentquadium
 In the United Kingdom, 154 is the telephone number used to report Business Faults with telephone provider BT

See also
 List of highways numbered 154
 United Nations Security Council Resolution 154
 United States Supreme Court cases, Volume 154

References

 Wells, D. The Penguin Dictionary of Curious and Interesting Numbers London: Penguin Group. (1987): 140 - 141

External links

 Virtual Science: Number 154

Integers